Morgan County is a county located in the U.S. state of Tennessee. As of the 2020 census, the population was 21,035. Its county seat is Wartburg. Morgan County is part of the Knoxville, TN Combined Statistical Area.

History
Morgan County was formed in 1817 from portions of Anderson and Roane counties. It was named in honor of Daniel Morgan (1736–1802), an American Revolutionary War officer who commanded the troops that defeated the British at the Battle of Cowpens, and who later served as a U.S. congressman from Virginia. The county had been part of lands relinquished by the Cherokee with the signing of the Third Treaty of Tellico in 1805. The original county seat was Montgomery until 1870, when it was moved to Wartburg.

Tornado
On November 10, 2002, a tornado destroyed 50 homes. At least seven people were killed in the Morgan County communities of Mossy Grove and Joyner.

Geography
The county, which lies on the eastern edge of the Cumberland Plateau, is known for its rugged mountain terrain, and cold mountain streams and rivers. The Crab Orchard Mountains comprise a large area of the county, which includes several designated wilderness areas, Frozen Head State Park, and Lone Mountain State Forest.

The Emory River rises on the slopes of Bird Mountain near Wartburg.  The Obed River, a designated national wild and scenic river, empties into the Emory southwest of Wartburg.  The Clear Fork, which forms part of Morgan's boundary with Fentress County, joins the New River in Scott County to the north to form the Big South Fork of the Cumberland River.

The Cumberland Trail passes through Morgan County.

Adjacent counties
Scott County (northeast)
Anderson County (east)
Roane County (south)
Cumberland County (southwest/CST Border)
Fentress County (northwest/CST Border)

National protected areas
 Big South Fork National River and Recreation Area (part)
 Obed Wild and Scenic River (part)

State protected areas
Catoosa Wildlife Management Area (part)
Frozen Head State Natural Area
Frozen Head State Park
Justin P. Wilson Cumberland Trail State Park
Lone Mountain State Forest
North Cumberland Wildlife Management Area (part)
Rugby State Natural Area

Demographics

2020 census

As of the 2020 United States census, there were 21,035 people, 7,625 households, and 5,659 families residing in the county.

2000 census
As of the census of 2000, there were 19,757 people, 6,990 households, and 5,235 families residing in the county.  The population density was 38 people per square mile (15/km2).  There were 7,714 housing units at an average density of 15 per square mile (6/km2).  The racial makeup of the county was 96.72% White, 2.23% Black or African American, 0.20% Native American, 0.12% Asian, 0.01% Pacific Islander, 0.14% from other races, and 0.59% from two or more races.  0.61% of the population were Hispanic or Latino of any race.

There were 6,990 households, out of which 33.50% had children under the age of 18 living with them, 60.70% were married couples living together, 10.30% had a female householder with no husband present, and 25.10% were non-families. 22.10% of all households were made up of individuals, and 9.30% had someone living alone who was 65 years of age or older.  The average household size was 2.58 and the average family size was 3.01.

In the county, the population was spread out, with 23.20% under the age of 18, 8.80% from 18 to 24, 31.90% from 25 to 44, 24.50% from 45 to 64, and 11.50% who were 65 years of age or older.  The median age was 36 years. For every 100 females, there were 114.30 males.  For every 100 females age 18 and over, there were 116.40 males.

The median income for a household in the county was $27,712, and the median income for a family was $31,901. Males had a median income of $25,683 versus $18,606 for females. The per capita income for the county was $12,925.  About 13.50% of families and 16.00% of the population were below the poverty line, including 18.50% of those under age 18 and 15.80% of those age 65 or over.

Communities

Cities

Harriman (mostly in Roane County)
Sunbright
Wartburg (seat)

Towns
Oakdale
Oliver Springs (part)

Census-designated places
Coalfield
Petros

Unincorporated communities
 Annadel
Deer Lodge
Joyner
Lancing
 Midway
Rugby (partial)
 Shady Grove

Politics

See also
National Register of Historic Places listings in Morgan County, Tennessee

References

Further reading

 Dickenson, W. Calvin (1987). Morgan County.  Memphis, Tenn.: Memphis State University Press.  
 Humphreys, James (2012). "Becoming Americans: Social Change in Morgan County, Tennessee, 1850–1870."  Journal of East Tennessee History, Vol. 84, pp. 23–39.

External links

 Official site
 Morgan County Chamber of Commerce
 Morgan County, TNGenWeb - free genealogy resources for the county

 Morgan county landforms

 
1817 establishments in Tennessee
Populated places established in 1817
Counties of Appalachia
Knoxville metropolitan area
East Tennessee